The Installation of the vizier, alt. Instruction of Rekhmire, Regulation laid upon the vizier Rekhmire, is an ancient Egyptian text dating to the New Kingdom found in Rekhmire's tomb at Thebes. It describes the office of the Egyptian vizier, his appointment, his duties, his relationships to other officials, and how to behave.

Two incomplete copies of the Regulation laid upon the vizier Rekhmire have survived, one in the tomb of Useramen (reign of Thutmose III) and another in the tomb of Amenemope (reign of Amenhotep II. The vizier's main functions according to the Regulation are in the fields of the judiciary, treasury, war, interior, agriculture, and general executive.

References
 M. Lichtheim, Ancient Egyptian Literature, Vol.2, University of California Press 1976, p. 21-24
 J. H. Breasted, Ancient Records of Egypt, Part Two, Chicago 1906, §§ 665ff.

Ancient Egyptian texts
Ancient Egyptian viziers